{{Infobox military conflict
|conflict=Battle of Atoleiros
|image=Raul Xavier Alegoria a D. Nuno Álvares Pereira IMG 8793.JPG
|caption=Raul Xavier, Allegory to D. Nuno Álvares Pereira: Atoleiros, Aljubarrota, Valverde , 1959, S. Jorge (Leiria)
|partof=1383–1385 Crisis
|date=6 April 1384
|place=Atoleiros, Alentejo, Portugal
|coordinates = 
|result=Portuguese victory
|combatant1= Kingdom of Portugal
|combatant2= Crown of Castile
|commander1=Nuno Álvares Pereira
|commander2= Fernando Sanchez de TovarPedro Álvares PereiraPero Gonzalez de SevillaMartim Anes de Barundo
|strength1=1,400 men:
1,000 foot soldiers
300 cavalry
100 crossbowman
|strength2=5,000 men
3,000 foot soldiers
2,000 cavalry
|casualties1=No casualties<ref>History of Portugal,  The first engagement of the war was fought by Nuno Álvares, who, despatched to reinforce the supporters of Avis in the Alentejo, met a superior Castilian force on April 6 at Atoleiros near Estremós, and defeated it, according to tradition without loss p.176</ref>
|casualties2=Heavy
|}}

The Battle of Atoleiros took place on 6 April 1384, between a Portuguese force and a punitive expedition from Castile sent by John I. The battle took place near the population centre of Fronteira in Alentejo. It was the first major battle of the 1383–1385 Crisis.

Nuno Álvares Pereira had been chosen to protect the frontier in this area, amid fear that a Castilian force could enter Portugal here. He left Lisbon with 1,000 infantry, adding to the strength of his forces on his way to Atoleiros. The Castilian army consisted of some 5,000 men, mostly cavalry, which was besieging the village of Fronteira. As Pereira approached, the Castilians sent an emissary to him, attempting to persuade him to retire. He refused, and the Castilians advanced to meet him, lifting the siege. The Portuguese formed a defensive square. In the short battle that followed, the Castilian cavalry was unable to break the Portuguese formation, suffering heavy losses. The Portuguese suffered none, and the Castilians withdrew.

The battle of Atoleiros represents the first effective use of “square tactics” on the battleground. This tactic, in which groups of infantry armed with both missile and hand-to-hand weapons defended themselves from all directions, was so successful that it was still in use over 500 years later during the Napoleonic Wars against mass French cavalry attacks, and during the Zulu War against huge masses of predominantly spear-armed infantry. It was especially effective when the infantry had to fight against strong cavalry.

See also
History of Portugal
Treaty of Ayllón
Interregnum
Treaty of Windsor (1386)
João das Regras
Hundred Years War
Philippa of Lancaster

Notes

References
Tony Jaques, Dictionary of Battles and Sieges: A-E (2007) History of Portugal: Pamphlet Collection (197?) 
Cláudio da Conceição, Gabinete historico: Desde 1325 até 1580 (1818)
José Soares da Sylva, Memorias para a historia de Portugal: que comprehendem o governo del rey D. Joaõ o I., do anno de mil etrezentos e oitenta e tres, até o anno de mil e quatrocentos e trinta e tres (1731)
José María da Graça Affreizo, Compendio de historia de Portugal (1885)
Damião António de Lemos Faria e Castro, Historia geral de Portugal, e suas conquistas'' (1786)

1384 in Europe
Atoleiros 1384
Atoleiros 1384
Atoleiros
Atoleiros